The Lihue Civic Center Historic District, in Lihue, Kauai, Hawaii, is a  historic district that was listed on the National Register of Historic Places in 1981.  It includes Classical Revival and Mission/spanish Revival architecture in structures dating back as far as 1913.  The Kauai County Courthouse, the County Building (1913), and the County Building Annex are the three contributing buildings in the district, and its one contributing site is a park;  all are within one city block in the center of downtown Lihue.

References

External links

Neoclassical architecture in Hawaii
Mission Revival architecture in Hawaii
Kauai County, Hawaii
1981 establishments in Hawaii
Historic districts on the National Register of Historic Places in Hawaii
National Register of Historic Places in Kauai County, Hawaii